In sociology, the iron cage is a concept introduced by Max Weber to describe the increased rationalization inherent in social life, particularly in Western capitalist societies. The "iron cage" thus traps individuals in systems based purely on teleological efficiency, rational calculation and control. Weber also described the bureaucratization of social order as "the polar night of icy darkness".

The original German term is stahlhartes Gehäuse (steel-hard casing); this was translated into "iron cage", an expression made familiar to English-speakers by Talcott Parsons in his 1930 translation of Weber's The Protestant Ethic and the Spirit of Capitalism. This choice has been questioned recently by scholars who prefer the more direct translation: "shell as hard as steel".

Weber (in Parsons' translation) wrote:

Iron cage of capitalism

In his famous 1904 work on The Protestant Ethic and the Spirit of Capitalism, Weber concludes by invoking an "iron cage." His meaning can best be understood by quoting the relevant paragraph:

Our modern market-dominated economic order was created by innovative, disciplined, religiously motivated economic action, says Weber. But the individual today can no longer engage in such creative action. Instead we are condemned to work for a living, often in narrowly defined specializations. And economic enterprises must continually strive to maximize profits and rationalize their production for the sake of efficiency or else fail. This is the present-day iron cage of institutionalized capitalism. 

Weber presents his argument in an ironic form. Religion of a particular sort was necessary to revolutionize the economy and the world. A protestant ethic drove the reorganization of traditional economic life to become a calculating efficient system. But now such religious views are no longer needed to sustain capitalism. Moreover, the systematic efficient calculations of capitalism help propel the secularization of the world and the decline in religious belief. "The course of development," Weber argues, "involves... the bringing in of calculation into the traditional brotherhood, displacing the old religious relationship."

Effects of bureaucracies

Positive contributions
Bureaucracies were distinct from the feudal system and patrimonialism where people were promoted on the basis of personal relationships. In bureaucracies, there was a set of rules that are clearly defined and promotion through technical qualifications, seniority and disciplinary control. Weber believes that this influenced modern society and how we operate today, especially politically.

Bureaucratic formalism is often connected to Weber's metaphor of the iron cage because the bureaucracy is the greatest expression of rationality.

Weber wrote that bureaucracies are goal-oriented organizations that are based on rational principles that are used to efficiently reach their goals. However, Weber also recognizes that there are constraints within the "iron cage" of such a bureaucratic system.

Negative effects of bureaucracies
Bureaucracies concentrate large amounts of power in a small number of people and are generally unregulated. Weber believed that those who control these organizations control the quality of our lives as well. Bureaucracies tend to generate oligarchy; which is where a few officials are the political and economic power. According to Weber, because bureaucracy is a form of organization superior to all others, further bureaucratization and rationalization may be an inescapable fate.

Iron cage of bureaucracy
Because of these aforementioned reasons, there will be an evolution of an iron cage, which will be a technically ordered, rigid, dehumanized society. The iron cage is the one set of rules and laws that we are all subjected and must adhere to. Bureaucracy puts us in an iron cage, which limits individual human freedom and potential instead of a "technological utopia" that should set us free. It is the way of the institution, where we do not have a choice anymore. Once capitalism came about, it was like a machine that you were being pulled into without an alternative option.
Laws of bureaucracies include the following:
 The official is subject to authority only with respect to their official obligation
 Organized in a clearly defined hierarchy of offices
 Each office has a clearly defined sphere of competence
 The official has a free contractual relationship; free selection
 Officials are selected through technical qualification
 The official is paid by fixed salaries
 The office is the primary occupation of the official
 Promotion is based on an achievement which is granted by the judgment of superiors
 The official works entirely separated from ownership of the means of administration
 The official is subject to strict and systematic discipline within the office

Costs of bureaucracies
"Rational calculation ... reduces every worker to a cog in this bureaucratic machine and, seeing himself in this light, he will merely ask how to transform himself... to a bigger cog... The passion for bureaucratization at this meeting drives us to despair."
 Loss of individuality; labor is now being sold to someone who is in control, instead of individuals being artisans and craftsmen and benefiting from their own labor.
 Loss of autonomy; others are dictating what an individual's services are worth.
 Individuals develop an obsession with moving on to bigger and better positions, but someone else will always be determining the value of their achievements.
 Lack of individual freedom; individuals can no longer engage in a society unless they belong to a large scale organization where they are given specific tasks in return for giving up their personal desires to conform to the bureaucracy's goals and are now following legal authority.
 Specialization; with specialization, society becomes more interdependent and has a less common purpose. There is a loss in the sense of community because the purpose of bureaucracies is to get the job done efficiently.

Bureaucratic hierarchies can control resources in pursuit of their own personal interests, which impacts society's lives greatly and society has no control over this. It also affects society's political order and governments because bureaucracies were built to regulate these organizations, but corruption remains an issue. The goal of the bureaucracy has a single-minded pursuit that can ruin social order; what might be good for the organization might not be good for the society as a whole, which can later harm the bureaucracy's future.
Formal rationalization in bureaucracy has its problems as well. There are issues of control, depersonalization and increasing domination. Once the bureaucracy is created, the control is indestructible. There is only one set of rules and procedures, which reduces everyone to the same level. Depersonalization occurs because individual situations are not accounted for. Most importantly, the bureaucracies will become more dominating over time unless they are stopped. In an advanced industrial-bureaucratic society, everything becomes part of the expanding machine, even people.

While bureaucracies are supposed to be based on rationalization, they act in the exact opposite manner. Political bureaucracies are established so that they protect our civil liberties, but they violate them with their imposing rules. Development and agricultural bureaucracies are set so that they help farmers, but put them out of business due to market competition that the bureaucracies contribute to. Service bureaucracies like health care are set to help the sick and elderly, but then they deny care based on specific criteria.

Debates regarding bureaucracies
Weber argues that bureaucracies have dominated modern society's social structure; but we need these bureaucracies to help regulate our complex society. Bureaucracies may have desirable intentions to some, but they tend to undermine human freedom and democracy in the long run.

It is important to note that according to Weber, society sets up these bureaucratic systems, and it is up to society to change them. Weber argues that it is very difficult to change or break these bureaucracies, but if they are indeed socially constructed, then society should be able to intervene and shift the system.

References

Sociological terminology
Max Weber